Alabang is a barangay in Muntinlupa, Philippines. At one time the area was a farming district, and has since grown from a village to a major commercial center, which includes the Filinvest City and Madrigal Business Park, and a transportation hub. A large portion of Ayala Alabang came from Barangay Alabang. It is formerly the location of the Alabang Stock Farm.

Etymology
According to the translation of the stories of previous generations to the elderly people who are still living in Alabang, the word Alabang comes from two words: Alibangban and Abangan (Filipino for wait).

Its leaves were about the size of a palm, and they appear to be twins that spread out during the day and gather spontaneously at night. Its leaves and fruits are also roasted because of its acidity. Also at night, it is crowded with fireflies. Using their torch light on the buttocks, they prey on the insects that land on the tree.

Currently, there are no Alibangbang trees to be found in Alabang.

Economy

Filinvest City

Barangay Alabang, part of the second district of Muntinlupa, has undergone tremendous growth mainly due to a development boom in the late 1990s. The development of high-end large scale commercial real estate projects; the Filinvest City, changed the landscape of the Alabang where it was once vast fields of cow pasture until the late 1980s, into a district that houses new residential, business, industrial and commercial establishments.

Some of the country's premier business district, Filinvest City's Spectrum Business District, The Northgate Cyberzone which specializes in hosting information and technology industries, the towering Insular Life Towers,  the Asian Star Building home to Fluor Corporation and other big companies, As SCA Hygiene Philippines, Henkel Philippines, Other Satellite Offices As ECOLAB, Maynilad Water, Filinvest Development Corporation, RDB Talents & Events Management Inc (BEATalent Development & Marketing Inc), My Fame & Fortune Talent Agency Inc, Verizon Wireless, Convergys Philippines, Genpact Philippines, Integra Philippines, HSBC Data Processing Service, E Telecare, Firstsource Solutions Limited, The Hershey Company Philippines, Petit Monde Apparel Corp, Unilever Philippines, Filinvest Alabang Inc, &, Shell Philippines B.V. the Asian Hospital and Medical Center, FEU Alabang, the phase of the Hotel Buildings Crimson Suites, Acacia Hotel, and The Bellevue Manila Hotel, with the future development of The Peninsula Hotels in Filinvest City, designed by B+H Architecture.

Shopping centers

Festival Alabang is a large shopping mall owned and operated by Filinvest Development Corporation located at Filinvest City in Barangay Alabang, Muntinlupa. The mall opened in the middle of May 1998, and it became Filinvest's flagship project, setting the standard for shopping centers in the south of Metro Manila. The whole Festival Alabang complex has an area of over 30 hectares, the biggest mall in the south of Metro Manila, with the most number of tenants, and still remains as one of the largest malls in the Philippines.

Festival Alabang is the biggest of all five current malls in city. It is also adjacent to some of the largest malls south of Metro Manila, namely Alabang Town Center, SM Southmall, and other malls like Starmall Alabang (Formerly Metropolis Star Alabang), Liana's Alabang, and Ayala Malls South Park.

Starmall Alabang, or formerly known as Metropolis Star Alabang is the first community shopping mall in this city and it is owned by Starmalls, Inc. It has features and anchors like: Robinsons Supermarket, Robinsons Department Store, Finds, Cinemas, and among others.

There are also the South station, Fastbyte at Northgate, Westgate Center, Commerce Center, South Supermarket and The Filinvest Tent Commercial Block.

Car Dealerships
There are multiple car dealerships located in Muntinlupa and most of them are along the Alabang–Zapote Road in Alabang. The Ford dealership boasts a 2-floor, 23-vehicle showroom and a 4-floor, 80-bay service center. Toyota Alabang also constructed a facility with a showroom, parts warehouse, office & service facilities in a  lot adjacent to the Ford Dealership. Audi Westgate Alabang, Chevrolet Alabang, Chrysler Alabang, Mitsubishi Motors Alabang, Nissan and Suzuki Alabang are also located within the area, most of which are along the Alabang–Zapote Road. Still in Alabang–Zapote Road but located in barangay Ayala Alabang are Hyundai Alabang, Isuzu Alabang, Volkswagen Alabang and Honda Alabang.

See also
 Muntinlupa
 Ayala Alabang

References

External links

 West Valley Fault in Muntinlupa - 3229 IV 6C Alabang

Muntinlupa
Barangays of Metro Manila